Over Bridge, also known as Telford's Bridge, is a single span stone arch bridge spanning the canalised West Channel of the River Severn near Gloucester, England. It links Over to Alney Island.

Although there was a crossing at Over recorded in the Domesday Book, this bridge was built by Thomas Telford between 1825 and 1828, to carry traffic east-west. It was opened in 1830 and remained in use for traffic until 1974. Until the Severn Bridge was built in the 1960s, this was the lowest point downstream that the Severn could be crossed by road bridge.

The arch spans , and was based on Jean-Rodolphe Perronet's 1774 design for a bridge over the River Seine at Neuilly. It combines both an elliptical profile over most of the soffit with a segmental profile at its faces. This feature is known as a corne de vache.

When built, the arch sank by  when its timber centering was removed, and another  due to settlement of the arch foundations.

Today it is a pedestrian-only bridge, and is in the guardianship of Historic England as a scheduled ancient monument.  Road traffic on the A40 crosses the Severn on a new bridge alongside and upstream of it.

This is the last road bridge over the Severn before the Severn Crossings, and was the most downstream free crossing until tolls were removed from the Severn Bridge and Second Severn Crossing in December 2018, although the Severn Bridge already had free access for pedestrians, cyclists and mopeds and, as previously stated, there is no vehicular access to Over Bridge. The bridge is connected by segregated bicycle paths around Alney Island, to Highnam and Gloucester.

The Over Bridge can be seen from the train travelling from Gloucester on the way to Lydney or Chepstow on the Gloucester to Newport section of the former South Wales Railway.

See also 
Crossings of the River Severn

References 

Cragg, R., Civil Engineering Heritage: Wales & West Central England, Thomas Telford Publishing, 2nd edn., 1997
Witts, C., A Century of Bridges, River Severn Publications, 2nd edn., 1998

External links

 Over Bridge page at English Heritage
 Over Bridge on the BBC website

Bridges across the River Severn
Bridges in Gloucestershire
Bridges completed in 1828
English Heritage sites in Gloucestershire
Bridges by Thomas Telford
Scheduled monuments in Gloucestershire
1828 establishments in England